In India, mobile numbers (including pagers) on GSM, WCDMA, LTE and NR networks start with either 9, 8, 7 or 6. Each telecom circle is allowed to have multiple private operators; earlier it was two private + BSNL/MTNL, subsequently it changed to three private + BSNL/MTNL in GSM; now each telecom circle has all four operators including Reliance Jio, Bharti Airtel, Vodafone idea ltd and BSNL/MTNL.

All mobile phone numbers are 10 digits long. The way to split the numbers is 
defined in the National Numbering Plan as XXXXX-NNNNN. Here, XXXXX identifies the network operator and the telecom circle while NNNNN identifies the subscriber.

Source (gov website): https://dot.gov.in/access-services/allotment-msc-codes

Telecom circles

The Department of Telecommunications has divided India into various telecom circles such that within each circle, the call is treated as a local call, while across zones, it becomes a long-distance call. As of July 2018 there are 22 telecom circles or service areas. They are classified into four categories: Metro, A, B, C. Delhi, Mumbai, and Kolkata fall under Metro category.

A telecom circle is normally the entire state, with a few exceptions like Mumbai and Kolkata (which are different zones than their respective states), Goa (which is a part of the Maharashtra zone), Chhattisgarh (which is part of Madhya Pradesh), Sikkim (which is part of West Bengal) Jharkhand (which is a part of the Bihar zone), Northeastern states except Assam and Sikkim (which are part of Northeast zone) or Uttar Pradesh (divided into east and west zones). Delhi is a unique circle because it includes towns from Haryana (Gurgaon and Faridabad) and Uttar Pradesh (Noida and Ghaziabad) as well. The new state of Telangana remains in the same circle as Andhra Pradesh.

From May 20, 2005, calls between Mumbai Metro and Maharashtra Telecom Circle, between Chennai Metro and Tamil Nadu Telecom Circle,  and between Uttar Pradesh (East) and Uttar Pradesh (West) Telecom Circle service areas are merged in Inter service area connected in the above-mentioned four states would be treated as intra-service area call for the purposes of routing as well as Access Deficit Charges (ADC). The dialing procedure for calls within a state for these states would also be simplified, i.e. dialing of mobile-to mobile subscribers and fixed-to-mobile subscribers would be without prefixing '0'.

In December 2017, Reliance Jio started with the newest of all, "the six-series-mobile numbers", keeping in mind the growing number of users in India. The growth in the number of 4G users in the country has made the 4G base larger than the 2G users in India pushing number of 2G users to second position.

Network operators 

Note: The mobile numbers and operators are subject to change since Mobile number portability is available in most circles.

Note: Chennai circle has been merged with Tamil Nadu circle.

9xxx series

8xxx series

7xxx series

6xxx series

References

India
Mobile telecommunications
 
Mobile phone industry in India